InterVol is a community volunteering charity based in the United Kingdom. InterVol support poverty reduction, conservation and education projects globally, as well as community volunteering based on university campuses in the United Kingdom. The charity is based at the University of Birmingham, Imperial College London, Lancaster University, University of Nottingham, and Oxford Brookes University.


History

Formation
InterVol was set up as a voluntary project in late 2003 by a group of students with the support of the Student Development (formerly Involve) department at the University of Birmingham Guild of Students. InterVol's volunteers began a system of student-led sustainable development projects, aiming to make a long term difference to communities in developing countries whilst working in close partnership with local NGOs in each country, as well as volunteering projects on their own campus.

Projects and expansion

In the summer of 2004 InterVol led three volunteering projects to Bulgaria, Cambodia and Uganda. The volunteers were involved in work including AIDS awareness training, work in children's centres, teaching English, and building the information technology capacity of local staff.
 
In 2005 the project roster increased to eight projects as the popularity and presence of the project on the University of Birmingham campus increased significantly. There were two new projects in Ecuador, based around cloud-forest conservation and social development, as well as a community development project in Accra, Ghana, a teaching project in Poland and a social development project in South Africa.
 
In 2006 previous projects were maintained while a new coastal development project in Thailand with Andaman Discoveries began in response to the Boxing Day Tsunami. InterVol supported volunteers to renovate facilities and coach sport at the New Future for Children centre in Phnom Penh, Cambodia, for the first time in July 2006. InterVol received its first national awards in 2006 when two founding volunteers, John Gorski and Danielle Gerson, won Impact awards at the National Year of the Volunteer Awards.

In 2007 a new project to construct school buildings and teach in rural Nepal commenced. This year also saw InterVol send volunteers to both a trafficked animal refuge and to teach Spanish to members of the Huaorani in Ecuador. The following year another project was set up in Kenya, a sports-based development project in Nairobi's Kibera slum.

In June 2010 the University of Nottingham's international volunteering project affiliated with InterVol to become the first InterVol branch outside Birmingham. InterVol's Nottingham project, based at the University of Nottingham Students' Union, continued to support volunteers to work with the Ugandan community development NGO, Little Big Africa. The charity expanded further, forming a new international volunteering group, Project Nepal, at Imperial College London in October 2011 and a new InterVol society at Lancaster University in December 2011. A group formed at Oxford Brookes in 2018, supporting education organisations in rural Nepal.

InterVol is a founding member of the Student Volunteering Overseas Partnership (SVOP), composed of UK student-led international volunteering charities including organisations from Bristol, Edinburgh and Oxford universities.

Charity status
Initially founded in 2003 as an initiative of the University of Birmingham Guild of Students, InterVol was a volunteering project within an exempt charity. InterVol became an independent registered charity in England and Wales in May 2010. InterVol's charitable objectives are to act as a resource for international volunteers at universities in the United Kingdom while promoting development projects that focus on education, health, conservation and the relief of poverty.

Project locations
InterVol currently support community organisations in the following countries: Ecuador, France (Calais), India, Malawi, and Nepal. Volunteers gain relevant experience through volunteering with local charities in their university communities before travelling overseas.

See also
Andaman Discoveries
Edinburgh Global Partnerships
University of Birmingham Guild of Students
Imperial College Union
Lancaster University
University of Nottingham Students' Union

References

External links
InterVol website
University of Birmingham InterVol Project
University of Nottingham InterVol Project
Imperial College London InterVol (Project Nepal)
Merazonia (InterVol Partner NGO, Ecuador)
Maya Universe Academy (InterVol Partner NGO, Nepal)

Development charities based in the United Kingdom
International volunteer organizations
Student organisations in the United Kingdom